Cadbury Athletic Football Club is an amateur football club based in Birmingham, England.

History 
The club was established in 1994, and were admitted to Division Three of the Midland Combination. Despite finishing ninth in their first season, they were promoted to Division Two. In 2000–01 a fourth-place finish was enough to secure promotion to Division One, with the club also winning the league's Challenge Vase. They were Division One runners-up in 2004–05, earning promotion to the Premier Division.

Despite finishing twelfth in the Premier Division in 2011–12, Cadbury Athletic resigned from the division and dropped into Division One. They were Division One champions in 2013–14, the last season before the league merged with the Midland Alliance to form the Midland League, with Cadbury Athletic placed in Division One. The club resigned from Division One at the end of the 2020–21 season and dropped into Division Two. The following season saw them win the Division Two title and the Birmingham Saturday Vase with a 4-0 victory over Tipton Town in the final.

Ground
The club originally played at the Cadbury Recreation Ground at the Cadbury factory in Bournville. Due to the lack of floodlights, the first team moved to Pilkington XXX's Triplex Sports Ground in Kings Norton, and then Alvechurch's Lye Meadow ground, before returning to the Triplex Ground.

The Triplex Ground was originally developed by Richmond Swifts. Levelling work between 1956 and 1958 led to banking being created on three sides of the pitch, with the fourth side left open for use as a cricket oval. A stand was built on the railway side of the pitch the mid-1990s, but Richmond left the ground after being unable to obtain planning permission to install floodlights. The ground was later taken over by Pilkington XXX, who were able to install floodlights.

After dropping into Division Two of the Midland League in 2021, the club returned to the Cadbury Recreation Ground.

Players
Several former youth players at Cadbury Athletic have gone on to play professional football, including Rico Henry, Ryan Burge, Demarai Gray, Corey O'Keeffe and Daniel Sturridge.

Honours
Midland League
Division Two champions 2021–22

Birmingham Saturday Vase
Winners 2021-22

Midland Combination
Division One champions 2013–14
Challenge Vase winners 2000–01

Records
Best FA Cup performance: Preliminary round, 2015–16
Best FA Vase performance: Fourth round, 2018–19

References

External links

Football clubs in England
Football clubs in Birmingham, West Midlands
Football clubs in the West Midlands (county)
Association football clubs established in 1994
1994 establishments in England
Cadbury
Midland Football Combination
Midland Football League
Works association football teams in England